Stefan Dimitrov (December 9, 1957 – June 2011) was  a Bulgarian  weightlifter. He won the Silver medal in 60 kg category in the 1980 Summer Olympics in Moscow.

References

1957 births
2011 deaths
Bulgarian male weightlifters
Olympic weightlifters of Bulgaria
Olympic silver medalists for Bulgaria
Olympic medalists in weightlifting
Weightlifters at the 1980 Summer Olympics
Medalists at the 1980 Summer Olympics
20th-century Bulgarian people
21st-century Bulgarian people